Oliver Wolcott Jr. (January 11, 1760 – June 1, 1833) was an American politician and judge. He was the second United States Secretary of the Treasury, a judge of the United States Circuit Court for the Second Circuit, and the 24th Governor of Connecticut. His life spanned from working in Connecticut, followed by the U.S. federal government in the Department of Treasury, before returning to Connecticut where he spent his life before his death. Throughout his time in politics, Wolcott's political views shifted from Federalist, to Toleration, and finally Jacksonian. Oliver Wolcott Jr. is the son to Oliver Wolcott Sr., part of the Griswold-Wolcott family.

Early life

Born on January 11, 1760, in Litchfield, Connecticut Colony, British America, Wolcott served in the Continental Army from 1777 to 1779, during the American Revolutionary War, then graduated from Yale University in 1778, where he was a member of Brothers in Unity and read law in 1781.

Oliver Wolcott Jr. and the Wolcott family were part of the Standing Order in Connecticut. This was a small group of families that were the elite members of Connecticut society, influencing politics, religion, and social power. John Adams compared them to the aristocracy of Connecticut. Wolcott Jr. developed his own sense of beliefs that differed from the Standing Order and was more inclusive of the general population in Connecticut.

Career

Early career 
He was clerk of the Connecticut Committee on Pay-Table from 1781 to 1782. He was a member of the Connecticut Committee on Pay-Table from 1782 to 1784. This group was responsible for accounting Connecticut's military expenses during the American Revolution.

Wolcott was also commissioner to settle claims of Connecticut against the United States from 1784 to 1788. He was Comptroller of Public Accounts for Connecticut from 1788 to 1789. He was Auditor for the United States Department of the Treasury from 1789 to 1791. He was Comptroller for the United States Department of the Treasury from 1791 to 1795. He was a commission merchant in New York City from 1793 to 1815. He was the 2nd Secretary of the Treasury from 1795 to 1800.

Treasury Department 
Before becoming the 2nd Secretary of Treasury, Wolcott was the first Auditor in the Treasury Department. According to Richard White, his duties as Auditor consisted of making the first examination of accounts and determining balances on all claims against the government. Working under the 1st Secretary of Treasury Alexander Hamilton and a fellow Federalist, this opened up Wolcott to attacks from Thomas Jefferson and were the beginnings of the first political parties: Hamilton’s Federalists and Jefferson's Democratic Republicans. 

The growing size and procedures of the federal government were implemented by bureaucrats like Wolcott. Wolcott was responsible for the branch system of the Bank of the United States that was approved by stockholders. Wolcott’s loyalty was rewarded when the Comptroller at the time, Nicholas Eveleigh, passed away in the spring of 1791. Hamilton wrote to Washington recommending Wolcott for the position on April 17, 1791, before Washington followed Hamilton's recommendation.As Comptroller, Wolcott was responsible for supervising the collection of duties on impost and tonnage. 

Hamilton resigned as Secretary of the Treasury in January 1795. President Washington appointed Wolcott to be the 2nd Secretary of the Treasury. While Wolcott was Secretary of the Treasury, he maintained close contact with Alexander Hamilton. Hamilton was able to influence Washington’s cabinet remotely through Wolcott as Secretary of the Treasury thanks to Wolcott’s loyalty when he worked under Hamilton as the 1st Secretary of the Treasury. This would no longer be the case when John Adams, a rival of Hamilton, became president in 1797. Apart from the Hamilton and Adams rivalry, Democratic Republicans continued their growing influence in government and attempts to oppose the Federalists. Albert Gallatin, a Jeffersonian, created the Ways and Means committee for Congress and the Legislature Branch to participate in determining financial policy and reduce the treasury’s growing power.  Wolcott had major responsibility for financing the Quasi-War with France in 1798-1800.

Martha Washington's escaped slave

On May 21, 1796, one of Martha Washington's slaves, Oney Judge (sometimes known as Ona), escaped from the Executive Mansion in Philadelphia, where she lived with the Washingtons during his presidency, serving as Washington's chambermaid. As Secretary, Wolcott was George Washington's intermediary in getting the Collector of Customs for Portsmouth, New Hampshire, Joseph Whipple, to capture and send Judge to Mount Vernon, where she had begun serving the Washingtons. Whipple met with Judge, discussed why she had escaped and tried to ascertain the facts of the case. After she told him she did not desire to be a slave again, Whipple refused to remove Judge against her will, said that it could cause civil unrest because of abolitionists, and recommended for the president to go through the courts if necessary. 

In their correspondence, Washington said that he wanted to avoid controversy and so he did not use the courts to take advantage of the method that he had signed into law under the Fugitive Slave Act of 1793. Whipple was aware that Wolcott and Washington both wanted Ona Judge to be captured even if that meant rounded up in the middle of the night. Whipple’s background in New Hampshire and family’s emancipation of slaves in the 1780s remained in the background during Washington’s desire to capture Judge. Wolcott reported back to Washington that Judge would return as his slave if there was emancipation at some point, and that Whipple wanted out of the search for Judge. Wolcott was relieved of his task in trying to capture Ona Judge on November 28, 1796, by Washington. 

Washington allegedly made another attempt to apprehend her in 1798, by his nephew, Burwell Bassett, but considering Bassett's spurious political alignment the allegation is skeptical at best and fraudulent at worst. According to the purported request, he was instructed to convince her to return or to take her by force, but Judge was warned by senator John Langdon and hid. Wolcott's involvement with this case ended with the first attempt to return Judge to slavery.

Federal judicial service 
He was confirmed by the United States Senate on February 20, 1801, and received his commission the same day. His service terminated on July 1, 1802, due to the abolition of the court.

Post Federal career 
Wolcott was a farmer from 1815 to 1816. He was the 24th Governor of Connecticut from 1817 to 1827. He was a candidate for Governor of Connecticut in 1827. He was the 5th Grand Master of the Most Worshipful Grand Lodge of the State of Connecticut of Ancient, Free & Accepted Masons from 1818 to 1820.

Governor of Connecticut 
Wolcott was elected as Governor of Connecticut in April 1817. He was the 3rd Wolcott to be governor of Connecticut, following his father and grandfather. During his time as governor, Wolcott Jr. became known for his moderate views that placed priority on Connecticut, not politics. This marked a shift in Connecticut governance prior to Oliver Wolcott Jr. Wolcott was head of the constitution convention and committee that drafted a new Connecticut constitution in 1818. Some of the changes found in the document included improving manufacturing laws, lowering taxes, prison reform, expanding voting for white males, religious freedom from the Congregational Church, and emigration.

Death

Wolcott died on June 1, 1833, in New York City. He was the last surviving cabinet member of the Washington administration.

Legacy

The town of Wolcott, Connecticut, was named in honor of Oliver Jr. and his father Oliver Sr.

References

Sources

External links
 Oliver Wolcott Jr. House
 The Ingraham Library
 

1760 births
1833 deaths
18th-century American politicians
19th-century American politicians
18th-century American judges
Connecticut Democratic-Republicans
Connecticut Federalists
Connecticut lawyers
Democratic-Republican Party state governors of the United States
Flag designers
Governors of Connecticut
John Adams administration cabinet members
Judges of the United States circuit courts
Litchfield Law School alumni
Military personnel from Connecticut
People of the Quasi-War
Politicians from Litchfield, Connecticut
Toleration Party politicians
Toleration Party state governors of the United States
United States federal judges appointed by John Adams
United States Secretaries of the Treasury
Washington administration cabinet members
Yale University alumni
United States federal judges admitted to the practice of law by reading law
Continental Army soldiers